David Alan Payne (born 15 February 1991) is an English cricketer who made his debut for Gloucestershire in 2009. A left-arm fast-medium bowler, he has represented England at U-19 level in both Test matches and One Day Internationals. He was named as part of the squad for the 2010 U-19 Cricket World Cup. Since his debut for Gloucestershire, he has become a key part of their bowling attack and often opened, and has also showed promise with the bat, by scoring his maiden First Class half-century at the end of the 2011 season. Payne made his international debut for the England cricket team in June 2022.

Career
Payne took a career best of 7–29 in the 2010 Clydesdale Bank 40 group match against Essex at Chelmsford in 2010. He dismissed James Foster, Grant Flower, Tim Phillips and Jaik Mickleburgh in just 4 balls, having previously dismissed Graham Napier just 2 balls before. Coincidentally he also recorded his best batting score in List A cricket in the same game. Essex won the game by 42 runs.

In July 2021, Payne was named in England's One Day International (ODI) squad for their series against Pakistan, after the original squad for the tour was forced to withdraw following positive tests for COVID-19. In December 2021, Payne was named in England's Twenty20 International (T20I) squad for their series against the West Indies.

In April 2022, he was bought by the Welsh Fire for the 2022 season of The Hundred. The following month, Payne was named in England's ODI squad for their series against the Netherlands. Payne made his ODI debut on 22 June 2022, for England against the Netherlands.

References

External links
 
 

1991 births
Living people
English cricketers
England One Day International cricketers
Gloucestershire cricketers
Cricketers from Poole
Dorset cricketers
Welsh Fire cricketers